GBA-21 (Ghizer-II) is a constituency of Gilgit Baltistan Assembly which is currently represented by Raja Jahanzaib of Pakistan Tehreek-e-Insaf.

Members

Election results

2009
Muhammad Ayub Shah, an Independent politician became member of assembly by getting 3,206 votes.

2015
Raja Jahanzaib of PTI won this seat by getting 7,252 votes. He is only person representing PTI in Gilgit Baltistan Assembly.

References

Gilgit-Baltistan Legislative Assembly constituencies